Lipinki Łużyckie is a village in Żary County, Lubusz Voivodeship, in western Poland. It is the seat of the gmina (administrative district) called Gmina Lipinki Łużyckie. Before 1945 the area was a part of Germany.

The village has a population of 1,800.

See also
Territorial changes of Poland after World War II''

References

Villages in Żary County